Rahima Ayla Dirkse (born 1993 in Rotterdam) is a Dutch model and beauty pageant titleholder who won Miss Nederland 2018 on 9 July 2018. She represented the Netherlands at Miss Universe 2018 pageant but unplaced.

Personal life
Rahima is raised in Rotterdam, Netherlands. Rahima, who has a Brazilian mother and a Dutch father. She is a student of bio-pharmaceutical sciences and works at her aunt's clothing store during the week.

Pageantry

Miss Nederland 2018 
Dirkse from Rotterdam was crowned Miss Nederland 2018 at a crowning gala held on 9 July 2018 at the AFAS Circustheater, Zuid-Holland. She succeeded outgoing Miss Nederland 2017 Nicky Opheij.

Miss Universe 2018 
Dirkse represented the Netherlands at Miss Universe 2018 pageant in Bangkok, Thailand. But failed to place.

References

External links

Living people
1994 births
Miss Universe 2018 contestants
Models from Rotterdam
Dutch beauty pageant winners
Dutch female models
Dutch people of Brazilian descent